Spring Valley Creek is a stream in Texas and Shannon counties of the Ozarks of southern Missouri. The stream is a tributary of the Current River.

The stream flows to the east-southeast passing into Shannon County south of Summersville. The stream passes under Missouri routes 17 and 106 and turns to the northeast.

The stream and the valley through which it flows was given the name for the many springs it contains.

References

Rivers of Shannon County, Missouri
Rivers of Texas County, Missouri
Bodies of water of the Ozarks